Saldívar or Saldivar is a Spanish surname of Basque origins. Notable people with the surname include:

Efren Saldivar
Juan Augusto Saldívar
John Saldivar
Vicente Saldivar
Yolanda Saldívar

See also
Zaldívar

Basque-language surnames
Spanish-language surnames